Else Roesdahl (born 26 February 1942) is a Danish archaeologist, historian and educator. She has mediated the history of the Vikings for most of her life, including coordination of notable exhibitions on the Viking Age and authoring several books on the subject. Roesdahl's books have been translated into several languages.

Her popular book The Vikings was first published in English in 1991.

Biography
Born in Sønderborg in southern Jutland, Roesdahl is the daughter of two medical doctors, Harald Eyvind Roesdahl and his wife Helene Refslund Thomsen. She and her siblings were brought up in a home where education had a high priority. After matriculating from Sønderborg Statsskole in 1960, she studied history and archaeology at Copenhagen University, graduating in 1969.

In 1970, she joined Aarhus University where she became a tenured lecturer in the newly formed Medieval Archaeology department in 1981 and ultimately a professor in 1996. Her first major work, Fyrkat : en jysk vikingeborg (1977) was on the Viking fortress at Fyrkat near Hobro in the north of Jutland, which she investigated together with Olaf Olsen. She went on to study other Viking fortifications, publishing her best seller Danmarks vikingetid in 1980, translated into English as Viking age Denmark (1982). Even more popular was her Vikingernes verden (1987), published in English as The Vikings in 1991. Roesdahl has also written many articles on the Vikings and the Middle Ages as well as a short book on the disappearance of Norsemen in Greenland titled Hvalrostand, elfenben og nordboere i Grønland (1995).

Roesdahl has also played a major role in coordinating exhibitions on the Vikings, including Vikingerne i England og hjemme i Danmark (The Vikings in England and their Danish homeland, 1981) also featured in York, England, and Viking og Hvidekrist (From Viking to Crusader, 1992) which travelled to Paris and Berlin before returning permanently to Copenhagen's National Museum of Denmark.

Now retired, Roesdahl still takes an active interest in Viking sites, opening the Fyrkat Viking Games in May 2016 and celebrating their 30th anniversary.

Awards
In 1988, Roesdahl received the Søren Gyldendal Prize, a literary award, and was later honoured as a Knight of the Order of the Dannebrog in 1992. In 1995, she was given an honorary doctorate by Trinity College, Dublin.

References

Living people
1942 births
20th-century Danish historians
21st-century Danish historians
20th-century Danish women writers
Danish archaeologists
University of Copenhagen alumni
Academic staff of Aarhus University
Danish women archaeologists
Knights of the Order of the Dannebrog
People from Sønderborg Municipality
Danish women historians